Himmelberger and Harrison Building, also known as the Liberty National Life Building and H & H Building, is a historic commercial building located at Cape Girardeau, Missouri.  It was built in 1907–1908, and is a five-story red brick, H-shaped structure.  It is a steel reinforced concrete building on a poured concrete foundation with a full basement.  It features a recessed marble entry flanked by round Tuscan order columns.

It was listed on the National Register of Historic Places in 2003.

References

Commercial buildings on the National Register of Historic Places in Missouri
Commercial buildings completed in 1908
Buildings and structures in Cape Girardeau County, Missouri
National Register of Historic Places in Cape Girardeau County, Missouri